Abdul Rahman Arshad (1936–2020) was a Malaysian academician, educator and diplomat.

Abdul Rahman Arshad may also refer to:

 Abdul Rahman Arshad (robber), alias Azman, convicted robber from Singapore